The assistant secretary of defense for space policy (ASD(SP)) is a position in the United States Department of Defense responsible for the overall supervision of DoD policy for space warfighting. The officeholder reports to the Under Secretary of Defense for Policy.

History 
It was created by the Department of Defense on October 29, 2020 after it was mandated by the National Defense Authorization Act of 2019. Previously, there was a deputy assistant secretary for space policy position that reports to the Assistant Secretary of Defense for Homeland Defense and Americas' Security Affairs. Acting Assistant Secretary of Defense for Space Policy Justin T. Johnson was then appointed to perform the duties of the office.

Organization 
 Assistant Secretary of Defense for Space Policy: John F. Plumb
 Principal Deputy Assistant Secretary of Defense for Space Policy: Vipin Narang
 Deputy Assistant Secretary of Defense for Cyber Policy: Mieke Eoyang
 Deputy Assistant Secretary of Defense for Nuclear and Countering Weapons of Mass Destruction Policy: Richard C. Johnson
 Deputy Assistant Secretary of Defense for Space and Missile Defense: John D. Hill
 Deputy Principal Cyber Advisor: Rear Admiral (lower half) Jeffrey Scheidt, USN

List of assistant secretaries of defense for space policy

List of principal deputy assistant secretaries of defense for space policy

List of deputy assistant secretaries of defense for space policy

References 

United States Assistant Secretaries of Defense